The Eyre is a coastal river that flows through the Landes of Gascony, in Aquitaine, southwest France.

The river is generally presented as the confluence of:
 the Grande Leyre (Large Leyre), its principal course, upstream from Moustey
 the Petite Leyre (Small Leyre), its main tributary

Name
Eyre is an Aquitanian hydronym. Note that Leyre is a variant of the name Eyre, affected by an agglutination of the Romance article.

Geography

The basin of the Eyre in included in the parc régional des Landes de Gascogne (National Park of the Moors of Gascony).

The river takes form in the Plantiet Marsh, in Grande Lande near Sabres, Landes.

It flows north into the Bassin d'Arcachon, a large bay on the Atlantic coast, in the Pays de Buch, Gironde. Its delta of  contains the Le Teich ornithological park.

The Eyre flows through a preserved environment. Its banks are bordered by a broad-leaved forest. Branches join over the river, forming a gallery forest, that contrasts with the Landes forest, planted with maritime pines.

Départements and towns
The Eyre flows through the following départements and towns:

 Landes: Pissos
 Gironde: Belin-Béliet, Salles, Mios, Le Teich

Tributaries
The main tributary of the Eyre is the Petite-Leyre. It rises between Luxey and Retjons, in Landes, and flows northwest to join the Grande Leyre downstream from Pissos.

 (R) Petite Leyre

N.B. : (R) = right tributary; (L) = left tributary

Historical sidenote
During the establishment of the French départements in 1790, the creation of a large département corresponding to the natural region of the Landes of Gascony – that is to say, today's Landes forest (then still unplanted) – was suggested. The name of this département would have been the Eyre.

Activities
 Canoeing (canoes rentals)

References

0Leyre
Ramsar sites in Metropolitan France
Rivers of France
Rivers of Gironde
Rivers of Landes (department)
Rivers of Nouvelle-Aquitaine